Today's Webtoon is a South Korean television series starring Kim Se-jeong, Choi Daniel, and Nam Yoon-su. It is a remake of a Japanese drama, which was based on the manga series Jūhan Shuttai!. It aired from July 29 to September 17, 2022 on SBS TV's Fridays and Saturdays at 22:00 (KST) time slot for 16 episodes.

Synopsis
Today's Webtoon tells the story of On Ma-eum (Kim Se-jeong), a former judo athlete, who struggles to adapt to her new job as webtoon editor after retiring as an athlete due to an injury.

Cast

Main
 Kim Se-jeong as On Ma-eum
 A rookie contract employee of the webtoon editorial department. She has a large appetite, a great sense of smell, and cauliflower ears typical of a fighter as a former standing member for the judo national team. On Ma-eum had to quit her athletic career when an unfortunate accident during a match tore her ankle ligament, but she begins to dream anew as a webtoon editor.
 Choi Daniel as Seok Ji-hyung
 An unpredictable deputy editor with an unreadable poker face who becomes a dependable mentor for On Ma-eum. Although he can be brutally honest, he's also a supportive editor who takes good care of his colleagues. Nevertheless, outside of work, he shows a more clumsy side with his various charms and silly jokes.
 Nam Yoon-su as Goo Jun-yeong
 A member of the sales team. He gradually grows to be more like On Ma-eum, who sincerely puts her heart and soul into everything, while looking back on himself.

Supporting

People around On Ma-eum
 Ko Chang-seok as On Gi-bong
 Hwang Young-hee as Hwang Mi-ok
 Yoon Seo-ah as On Nu-ri

Neon Webtoon Editorial Department
 Park Ho-san as Jang Man-cheol
 Yang Hyun-min as Kwon Young-bae
 Kang Rae-yeon as Ki Yu-mi 
 Ahn Tae-hwan as  Choi Doo-hee

Webtoon writers
 Kim Kap-soo as Baek Eo-jin
 Kim Do-hoon as Shin Dae-ryuk
 Jeon Hye-yeon as Guo-ah
 Ha Yul-ri as Pomme
 Im Chul-soo as Na Gang-nam
 Baek Seok-kwang as Lim Dong-hee
 Son Dong-woon as Oh Yoon
 Jang Sung-yoon as Lee Woo-jin

Others
 Baek Joo-hee as Yoon Tae-hee 
 Ha Do-kwon as Heo Kwan-young
 Nam Bo-ra as Jang Hye-mi
 Jin Ye-sol as Ji Han-seul

Extended
 Kim Yong-seok as Ma Hae-gyu
 Jeon Jun-ho as Lee Woo-jin's older brother
 Seo Yoon-ah as Goo Ae-ri
 Jung Eun-pyo as Mo Young-soo 
 Woo Jung-won as Kim Young-shin
 Jeon Chae-eun as Ma Yu-na
 Kim Soo-jin as Kang Kyung-ja

Special appearances
 Hwang Hee as Ahn Gyu-jin 
 Park Tae-joon as New webtoon writer 
 Meow as New webtoon writer

Viewership

Accolades

References

External links
  
 
 

Seoul Broadcasting System television dramas
Korean-language television shows
Television series by Studio S
Television series by Studio N (Naver)
Television shows based on Japanese webcomics
2022 South Korean television series debuts
2022 South Korean television series endings